Odontosphindus is a genus of cryptic slime mold beetles in the family Sphindidae. There are at least three described species in Odontosphindus.

Species
These three species belong to the genus Odontosphindus:
 Odontosphindus clavicornis Casey, 1898
 Odontosphindus denticollis LeConte, 1878
 Odontosphindus grandis (Hampe, 1861)

References

Further reading

 

Sphindidae
Articles created by Qbugbot